Donella lanceolata is a plant species in the family Sapotaceae. The bark is grey to dark brown. Inflorescences bear up to 45 flowers. Its habitat is lowland forests from sea level to  altitude. Its natural range is Madagascar, India, Sri Lanka, Thailand, Cambodia, Laos, Vietnam, Malaysia, Brunei, Indonesia, the Philippines, Papua New Guinea, the Solomon Islands and Queensland.

Synonyms
Homotypic synonyms
 Chrysophyllum javanicum 
 Chrysophyllum lanceolatum 
 Lucuma lanceolata 
 Nycterisition lanceolatum 

Heterotypic synonyms
 Chrysophyllum acuminatum 
 Chrysophyllum bancanum 
 Chrysophyllum dioicum 
 Chrysophyllum lanceolatum var. papuanum 
 Chrysophyllum lanceolatum var. stellatocarpon 
 Chrysophyllum pentagonum 
 Chrysophyllum roxburghianum 
 Chrysophyllum roxburghii 
 Chrysophyllum roxburghii var. papuanum 
 Chrysophyllum sumatranum 
 Donella lanceolata var. malagassica 
 Donella roxburghii 
 [[Donella roxburghii var. tonkinensis |Donella roxburghii var. tonkinensis]] 
 Lucuma tomentosa 
 Niemeyera papuana

Conservation
This species is listed by the International Union for Conservation of Nature (IUCN)) as least concern, citing its wide distribution across a number of countries, its large population and its occurrence in protected areas as the basis for the assessment.

In Australia, the Queensland Department of Environment and Science (DES) has assessed it as near threatened. Although there is no explanation provided by DES, the species only occurs in a few scattered locations in Queensland, which may account for the status.

References

lanceolata
Flora of tropical Asia
Trees of Australia
Flora of Queensland
Flora of Madagascar
Flora of the Solomon Islands (archipelago)
Taxa named by André Aubréville
Plants described in 1963